Kelly's Roast Beef is a regional fast food restaurant chain located in Massachusetts. It is known for its roast beef sandwiches, lobster rolls, and other seafood. It was founded in 1951 in the city of Revere, Massachusetts, on Revere Beach shoreline by two partners, Frank V. McCarthy, and Raymond Carey. Neither partner wanted to be the namesake of the restaurant, so they decided to name it after a mutual friend, Thomas Kelley, a florist from Dorchester.

The chain's menu consists primarily of sandwiches, seafood, and shellfish, as well as its signature roast beef. The restaurant features a drive-thru at every location except at Revere Beach. To compete with fast food giants like McDonald's and Burger King, the company added chicken fingers and french fries to their menu.

Kelly's claims to have invented the modern roast beef sandwich, stating it was unknown before they introduced it in 1951.

Menu and recognition
Despite its name, Kelly's Roast Beef is also noted for its lobster roll, with frequent mentions on reader contributor websites like Yelp and Chowhound, and placings on top ten lists of the area's best.

Kelly's has become nationally known and has been featured in the PBS documentary Sandwiches That You Will Like and on the Food Network show $40 a Day.

Locations
Massachusetts locations include the flagship restaurant in Revere, Danvers, Medford, and Saugus. In 2022, Kelly's opened in New Hampshire and Florida, with further expansion in the works.

References

External links
 
 Official website

Fast-food chains of the United States
Restaurants in Massachusetts
Restaurants established in 1951
1951 establishments in Massachusetts
Revere, Massachusetts
Roast beef restaurants in the United States